The 154th Battalion, CEF was a unit in the Canadian Expeditionary Force during the First World War.  Based in Cornwall, Ontario, the unit began recruiting in late 1915 in Stormont, Dundas, and Glengarry Counties.  After sailing to England in October 1916, the battalion was absorbed into the 6th Reserve Battalion on January 31, 1917.  The 154th Battalion, CEF had one Officer Commanding: Lieutenant-Colonel A. G. F. MacDonald. The Stormont, Dundas and Glengarry Highlanders perpetuate the 154th Battalion.

References

Meek, John F. Over the Top! The Canadian Infantry in the First World War. Orangeville, Ont.: The Author, 1971.

Battalions of the Canadian Expeditionary Force
Cornwall, Ontario
Stormont, Dundas and Glengarry Highlanders